Pedinopetalum is a genus of flowering plants belonging to the family Apiaceae.

Its native range is Hispaniola.

Species:
 Pedinopetalum domingense Urb. & H.Wolff

References

Apiaceae
Apiaceae genera